Šurany (until 1927, Veľké Šurany;) is a town and a railroad hub in the Nové Zámky District, Nitra Region, southern Slovakia.

Alongside the main settlement, it has the boroughs of Kostolný Sek and Nitriansky Hrádok, both annexed 1976.

Etymology
The town name comes from Slavic šur-, šurý (curved, in a wider sense hilly) + the suffix -any referring to people. Šurany: "people from hills", the opposite of Rovňany: "people from plains".

History 
Archaeological discoveries show that the site of the present-day town was inhabited in the Neolithic.  The town was first mentioned under name villa Suran in a document of Hungarian king Béla II in 1138. There was a castle existing since the second half of the 15th century.  Between 1568 and 1581, the town was the seat of the Captaincy of Lower Hungary. The settlement was occupied by the Turks in 1663–84. The castle was torn down in 1725. In 1832 the town was made a royal town with market rights. A sugar factory was established in 1854 (closed in 2000). The town was part of Hungary until 1920 and in 1938–45 as a consequence of the First Vienna Award.

Geography 

Demographics 

According to the 2001 census, the town had 10,491 inhabitants. 97.28% of inhabitants were Slovaks, 1.12% Hungarians, 0.64% Czechs. The religious make-up was 80.02% Roman Catholics, 14.76% people with no religious affiliation, and 1.19% Lutherans.

People 
Šurany featured in a 2006 episode of Who Do You Think You Are? featuring Stephen Fry. Fry was tracing his Jewish ancestry in the town, where his maternal grandfather Martin Neumann was a manager at the Šurany sugar factory and was recruited to work in the burgeoning sugar industry in Bury St Edmunds, England. Neumann and his wife Rosa Braun Neumann immigrated to Bury in 1926.

References

External links 
  (Slovak, only History is in English as well)
Šurany – Nové Zámky okolie

Cities and towns in Slovakia